Benthomangelia grippi is an extinct species of sea snail, a marine gastropod mollusk in the family Mangeliidae.

Description

Distribution
This extinct marine species was found in Miocene strata in Germany.

References

 Anderson H.J. 1964. Die miocäne Reinbek-Stufe in Nord- und Westdeutschland und ihre MolluskenFauna.  Fortschr. Geol. Rheinld. Westf., 14: 31–368, Taf. 1-52, 18 Abb., 3 Tab. 
 H. Moths, F. Albrecht, and G. Stein. 2010. Die molluskenfauna (Hermmorium, Untermiozän) aus der Kiesgrube kirnke bei Werder (Nordwest-Niedersachsen). Palaeofocus 3:1–155

External links
 International Fossil Shell Museum: Image of Benthomangelia grippi

grippi
Gastropods described in 1964